George Colley (18 October 1925 – 17 September 1983) was an Irish Fianna Fáil politician who served as Tánaiste from 1977 to 1981, Minister for Energy from 1980 to 1981, Minister for Tourism and Transport from 1979 to 1980, Minister for the Public Service from 1977 to 1979, Minister for Finance from 1970 to 1973 and from 1977 to 1979, Minister for the Gaeltacht from 1969 to 1973, Minister for Industry and Commerce from 1966 to 1970, Minister for Education from 1965 to 1966 and Parliamentary Secretary to the Minister for Lands from 1964 to 1965. He served as a Teachta Dála (TD) from 1961 to 1983.

Early life
Colley was born in the Dublin suburb of Fairview, in 1925. He was the son of Harry Colley and Christina Colley (née Nugent). His father was a veteran of the 1916 Easter Rising and a former adjutant in the Irish Republican Army (IRA), who was elected to Dáil Éireann in 1944, as a Fianna Fáil candidate.

He was educated at St Joseph's Secondary C.B.S. in Fairview, where one of his classmates and closest friends was Charles Haughey, who later became his political arch rival. He studied law at University College Dublin and qualified as a solicitor in the mid-1940s. He remained friends with Haughey after leaving school and, ironically, encouraged him to become a member of Fianna Fáil in 1951. Haughey was elected to Dáil Éireann in the 1957 general election, ousting Colley's father in the process. This put some strain on the relationship between the two young men.

Political career
Colley was elected to the Dáil at the 1961 general election, reclaiming his father's old seat in the Dublin North-East constituency. Furthermore, he was elected in the same constituency as Haughey, thereby accentuating the rivalry. Thereafter, Colley progressed rapidly through the ranks of Fianna Fáil. He became a member of the Dáil at a time when a change from the older to the younger generation was taking place, a change facilitated by the Taoiseach Seán Lemass.

He was active in the Oireachtas as chairman of some of the Joint Labour Committees, which were set up under the Labour Court, to fix legally enforceable wages for groups of workers who had not been effectively organised in trade unions. He was also leader of the Irish parliamentary delegation to the Consultative Assembly of the Council of Europe. Colley's work as a backbencher was rewarded by his appointment as Parliamentary Secretary to the Minister for Lands in October 1964.

Minister for Education (1965–66)
Following the return of Lemass's government at the 1965 general election, Colley joined the cabinet as Minister for Education. He introduced a plan to establish comprehensive schools, set up an advisory council on post-primary school accommodation in Dublin, and introduced a school psychological service.

Minister for Industry and Commerce (1966–70)
He was promoted as Minister for Industry and Commerce, in a cabinet reshuffle in July 1966, and he continued the government policy of economic expansion that had prevailed since the late 1950s.

In November 1966, Seán Lemass resigned suddenly as party leader. Colley contested the subsequent leadership election. He was the favoured candidate of party elders such as Seán MacEntee and Frank Aiken, the latter managing Colley's campaign and annoyed at Lemass's quick decision to retire before Colley had built up his support. Colley was considered to be in the same mould as the party founders, concerned with issues such as the peaceful re-unification of the country and the cause of the Irish language. Charles Haughey and Neil Blaney, also declared their interest in the leadership; however, both withdrew when the Minister for Finance, Jack Lynch, announced his candidacy. Colley did not back down and the leadership issue went to a vote for the first time in the history of the Fianna Fáil party.

The leadership election took place on 9 November 1966, and Lynch beat Colley by 59 votes to 19. When the new Taoiseach announced his cabinet, Colley retained the Industry and Commerce portfolio.

Following Fianna Fáil's success at the 1969 general election, Colley held onto his existing cabinet post and also took charge of the Gaeltacht portfolio, an area where he had a personal interest. He used this dual position to direct industrial investment to Gaeltacht areas. He set about changing the traditional view of the Irish-speaking regions as backward and promoted their equal claim to the more sophisticated industries being established in Ireland by foreign investment.

Minister for Finance (1970–73)
In the wake of the Arms Crisis in 1970, a major reshuffle of the cabinet took place. Four Ministers, Charles Haughey, Neil Blaney, Kevin Boland and Mícheál Ó Móráin, were either removed, or resigned, or simply retired from the government due to the scandal that was about to unfold. Despite his defeat by Jack Lynch in the leadership contest four years earlier, Colley had remained loyal to the party leader and had become a close political ally. He was rewarded by his appointment as Minister for Finance, the second most important position in government, while retaining the Gaeltacht portfolio.

Colley was regarded as a predictable Minister and the ultimate safe man, as a highly orthodox Keynesian. His decision to introduce budget deficits in his first three budgets was even welcomed by the opposition. He oversaw the decimalisation of the Irish currency in 1971. He also championed the introduction of RTÉ Raidió na Gaeltachta and argued the financial case for it in 1972, as the Minister with responsibility for the Gaeltacht.

In opposition (1973–77)
In 1973, Fianna Fáil were ousted after sixteen years in government when the national coalition of Fine Gael and the Labour Party came to power. Colley was appointed opposition Spokesman on Finance, in the new Fianna Fáil front bench. He came to be regarded as a hard-working spokesman and was a constant critic of what he viewed as the coalition government's restrictive economic policy and of the capital taxation which he believed discouraged investment.

As the 1977 general election approached, Colley and Martin O'Donoghue were the main architects of Fianna Fáil's election manifesto. The party's programme for government included a number of inducements, including the abolition of car tax and rates on houses, as it was believed that the coalition government would retain office.

Tánaiste and Minister (1977–81)
Fianna Fáil swept to power at the 1977 general election, with a 20-seat Dáil majority, contrary to opinion polls and political commentators. Colley was re-appointed as Minister for Finance and Minister for the Public Service, and was also appointed as Tánaiste (Deputy Prime Minister). The latter appointment established him firmly as the heir apparent to Taoiseach Jack Lynch.

During his second term as Finance Minister, Colley implemented controversial policies from the election manifesto. He immediately set about dismantling the previous government's capital taxation programme while also abolishing the wealth tax and diluting the capital gains and capital acquisitions taxes. His policy of low taxation and continued government investment resulted in massive foreign borrowing and a balance of payments deficit. In 1979, Fianna Fáil's economic policies were derailed due to strikes, higher wage demands, and the 1979 energy crisis. The introduction of a two percent levy on agricultural production angered some rural backbench TDs, and party tensions emerged.

In December 1979, Jack Lynch resigned unexpectedly as Taoiseach and as Fianna Fáil leader. It is said that Colley and his supporters encouraged Lynch to retire one month earlier than planned because he felt he had the support to win a leadership contest and that the quick decision would catch Charles Haughey and his supporters off guard.

Support for both candidates was evenly matched throughout the leadership contest. Colley had the backing of the majority of the Cabinet and the party hierarchy, while Haughey relied on support from the first-time backbenchers. A secret ballot was taken on Friday, 7 December 1979. The Minister for Foreign Affairs, Michael O'Kennedy announced his support for Haughey on the eve of the election. This was believed to have swung the vote, and Haughey beat Colley by 44 votes to 38.

Colley remained as Tánaiste, but demanded and received a veto on Haughey's ministerial appointments to the departments of Justice and Defence. Colley was removed from his position as Minister for Finance and Minister for the Public Service. He declined the position of Minister for Foreign Affairs, preferring instead a domestic portfolio, which resulted in a demotion. He was temporarily appointed Minister for Transport and Tourism, before taking charge of the new Department of Energy. During his brief tenure, he blocked the Nuclear Energy Board's controversial plan to build a nuclear power plant at Carnsore Point in County Wexford.

Later career
Fianna Fáil lost power at the 1981 general election, when a short-lived Fine Gael-Labour Party coalition government took office. Haughey delayed naming a new opposition front bench, but Colley was still a key member of the Fianna Fáil hierarchy.

Fianna Fáil regained office at the February 1982 general election, but there was disquiet about Haughey's leadership and the failure to secure an overall majority. Colley demanded the same veto as before on Haughey's Defence and Justice appointments, but was refused. When it was revealed that Ray MacSharry would be appointed Tánaiste in his stead, he declined another ministerial position. This effectively brought his front bench political career to an end, but he remained a vocal critic of the party leadership from the backbenches.

When the Fianna Fáil government collapsed and were replaced by another coalition government after the November 1982 general election, a number of TDs and Senators expressed lack of confidence in Haughey's leadership once again. Several unsuccessful leadership challenges took place in late 1982 and early 1983, with Colley now supporting Desmond O'Malley and the Gang of 22 who opposed Haughey.

Later life and death
Colley met his future wife, Mary Doolan, on Irish-language courses in the Kerry Gaeltacht. They married on 27 September 1950 and had three sons and four daughters, one of whom, Anne Colley, became a TD as a member of the Progressive Democrats party. 

Colley died suddenly on 17 September 1983, aged 57, while receiving treatment for a heart condition at Guy's Hospital, London.

See also
Families in the Oireachtas

References

1925 births
1983 deaths
People educated at St. Joseph's CBS, Fairview
Alumni of University College Dublin
George
Fianna Fáil TDs
Ministers for Finance (Ireland)
Members of the 17th Dáil
Members of the 18th Dáil
Members of the 19th Dáil
Members of the 20th Dáil
Members of the 21st Dáil
Members of the 22nd Dáil
Members of the 23rd Dáil
Members of the 24th Dáil
Ministers for Education (Ireland)
Ministers for Transport (Ireland)
Parliamentary Secretaries of the 17th Dáil
Politicians from County Dublin
Tánaistí
Ministers for Enterprise, Trade and Employment